Beneath the Encasing of Ashes is the debut album by American metalcore band As I Lay Dying. Many reviewers and also casual listeners compared the overall sound of this album to Zao. It is widely thought that the band found its own sound on later albums, Frail Words Collapse and Shadows Are Security. All the songs on Beneath the Encasing of Ashes appear on the compilation album A Long March: The First Recordings.

Re-recordings
The closing track, "Behind Me Lies Another Fallen Soldier" was re-recorded for the band's second album, Frail Words Collapse.
They also re-recorded a medley, which includes parts from several songs from the album, which was included on Decas.

Track listing

Personnel 
As I Lay Dying
 Tim Lambesis – vocals, keyboards
 Evan White – guitars
 Noah Chase – bass
 Jordan Mancino – drums

Production
 Nolan Brett – mastering
 Brian Cobbel – executive producer
 Jeff Forest – engineer
 Tim Lambesis – producer
 Darren Paul – design, layout concept
 Eric Shirey – executive producer
 Evan White – producer

References 

2001 debut albums
As I Lay Dying (band) albums
Pluto Records albums